Pombalinho is a village and a civil parish in the municipality of Golegã, Portugal. The population in 2011 was 448, in an area of 7.70 km2.

History
Located on the right bank of the Tagus River, 22 kilometers northeast of the city of Santarém, in Roman antiquity it was an important satellite town of that city, which was founded by the Romans who occupied the region in the 2nd century BC and named the larger settlement Scalabis. Pombalinho was formerly called Santa Cruz do Pombal but became known from the 18th century onwards by the name of Pombalinho to distinguish it from other villages with the same name, especially the town of Pombal. The 1st Baron of Pombalinho, António Vasques da Cunha de Araújo Porto Carrero, was mentioned on Almeida Garrett's (1799 – 1854) Viagens na Minha Terra (Travels in My Homeland). Before 2013, it was part of Santarém municipality. In 2013 the civil parish of Pombalinho was merged into the municipality of Golegã.

Geography
The territory of this village and respective civil parish, in the fertile Lezíria do Tejo (roughly the same area of the historical province of Ribatejo), is almost exclusively used for agriculture. Pombalinho's festivities take place in the festival of Saint  Sebastian from 27 to 29 June, with mass singing, sermon, procession, Cavalhadas, among other activities.

Heraldry
Symbolism of the Coat: The green shield represents agriculture. Aspa checker of red and gold, the combination of the patron saint (Santa Cruz) and colors of the arms of the baron Pombalinho (chess with gold, and the quote of Portocarreras loaded with pictures of red gold, the rocks), and a Roman pavement made recently discovered, with parallelepiped of various colors. Two doves in silver, outlined in the flanks, speaker element. Bunch of grapes silver, sheets of gold, to represent a source of wealth of the parish. Roca linen on edge, with other agricultural production. The flag is yellow, color of the pieces taken from the main shield.

Culture and sports
 Soccer Field
 Group of Folklore dancing and singing of Ribatejo - POMBALINHO
 Vera Cruz Football Club
 House People's Pombalinho
 Annual Festivals S. Sebastian

Mayors since 1921

Note

References

Freguesias of Golegã